The 2004–05 NC State Wolfpack men's basketball team represented North Carolina State University as a member of the Atlantic Coast Conference during the 2004–05 men's college basketball season. It was Herb Sendek's ninth season as head coach. The Wolfpack earned a bid to the NCAA tournament, reached the Sweet Sixteen, and finished with a record of 21–14 (7–9 ACC).

Roster

Schedule

|-
!colspan=9 style=| Regular season

|-
!colspan=9 style=| ACC Tournament

|-
!colspan=9 style=| NCAA Tournament

Rankings

NBA draft

References

NC State Wolfpack men's basketball seasons
Nc State
NC State Wolfpack men's basketball
NC State Wolfpack men's basketball
Nc State